Daghalian-e Bala (also Romanized as Daghalīān-e Bālā; also known as Daghlīān-e ‘Olyā, Dāghlīān-e ‘Olyā, and Daghliyan Olya) is a village in Azghan Rural District, in the Central District of Ahar County, East Azerbaijan Province, Iran. At the 2006 census, its population was 221, in 48 families.

References 

Populated places in Ahar County